Nuno Borges may refer to:

Nuno Borges Carvalho (born 1972), Angolan engineer
Nuno Borges (footballer) (born 1988), Cape Verdean footballer
Nuno Borges (tennis) (born 1997), Portuguese tennis player